Petersburg is a small unincorporated community and census-designated place in southeastern Springfield Township, Mahoning County, Ohio, United States. The population was 405 at the 2020 census. It is part of the Youngstown–Warren metropolitan area. 

Petersburg is located at the intersection of Ohio State Routes 170 and 617. It is skirted by Interstate 76, the far eastern end of the Ohio Turnpike. The community was founded in the 1790s by German immigrants from Pennsylvania, which it neighbors.

History

Petersburg was platted around 1805 by Peter Musser, and named for him. The post office was originally called Musser's Mill. The Mussers Mills post office was established in 1807, the name was changed to Petersburgh in 1819, and renamed again Petersburg in 1893.

The building that was once used as the Petersburg Inn burned to the ground in 1961 and was believed to have been built around 1800. A few other significant historical buildings in the community were St. John's Lutheran Church and the Petersburg Presbyterian Church that were founded by early settlers of that area including the following families: Wallace, Musser, Smith and Kneasel.

Education
Children in Petersburg are served by the Springfield Local School District. The current schools serving the community are:
Springfield Local Elementary School – grades K-4
Springfield Local Intermediate School – grades 5-8
Springfield Local High School – grades 9-12

References

Unincorporated communities in Mahoning County, Ohio
German-American culture in Ohio
1790s establishments in the Northwest Territory
Unincorporated communities in Ohio